The 2009 Dublin Senior Hurling Championship is a Dublin based GAA club competition between the top clubs in Dublin Hurling.

Round robin

Group A

Fixtures

Group B

Fixtures

Group C

Fixtures

Group D

Fixtures

Quarter finals

Semi finals
The semi finals will feature O'Tooles, Lucan Sarsfields, Ballyboden St Enda's and Craobh Chiaráin.

Dublin Senior Club Hurling Final

See also
 Dublin Senior Hurling Championship 2006
 Dublin Senior Hurling Championship 2009

References

External links
Statistics

Dublin Senior Hurling Championship
Dublin Senior Hurling Championship